Doma TV is a Croatian specialized television channel.

Programming aired by Doma TV

Telenovelas

Ended
 Acorralada
 Alborada
 Amar sin limites
 Amor real
 Amores Verdaderos
 Anna und die Liebe (canceled after 254 episodes)
 Apuesta por un amor
 Balika Vadhu
 Camaleones
 Corazón Indomable
 Cuidado con el ángel
 Doña Bárbara
 El Fantasma de Elena
 En nombre del amor
 Esmeralda
 Eva Luna
 Heridas de Amor
 Îngerașii
 Gipsy Heart
 Iubire și onoare
 Juro Que Te Amo
 La gata
 La Reina del Sur
 La tempestad
 La usurpadora
 La que no podía amar
 Las Bandidas
 Laberintos de pasión
 Lo que la vida me robó
 Madre Luna
 Mañana es para siempre
 Mariana de la noche
 Marisol
 Medcezir (canceled after s1)
 Pod sretnom zvijezdom
 Porque el amor manda
 Por tu amor
 ¿Quién Eres Tú?
 Rebelde
 Rubí
 Rosalinda
 Rosario Tijeras, amar es más difícil que matar
 Salomé
 Sortilegio
 Teresa
 Tormenta en el paraiso
 Triunfo del Amor
 Udaan (canceled after 100 episodes due to low ratings)
 Valeria
 Zakon Ljubavi

Series & miniseries

Airing currently
 Friends (rerun of all seasons)
 NCIS: Los Angeles (all seasons)
 NCIS: New Orleans (rerun of all seasons)
 Perception (rerun of all seasons)
 Popeye (all seasons)
 Solo per amore (all seasons)
 The Following (season 3 airing)
 The Smurfs (all seasons)
 Tom and Jerry (all seasons)
 Walker, Texas Ranger (rerun of all seasons)

Hiatus
 2 Broke Girls (seasons 1-4 aired)
 Arrow (season 1-3 aired)
 Blindspot (season 1 aired)
 Body of Proof (seasons 1-2 aired)
 Community (seasons 1-5 aired)
 Days of Our Lives (260 episodes aired)
 Hart of Dixie (seasons 1-3 aired)
 Justified (seasons 1-5 aired)
 Longmire (seasons 1-3 aired)
 Major Crimes (seasons 1-3 aired)
 Masha and the Bear (52 episodes aired)
 Masters of Sex (seasons 1-3 aired)
 Mike & Molly (season 1-4 aired)
 Mom (seasons 1-2 aired)
 NCIS (seasons 1-13 aired)
 NCIS: New Orleans (seasons 1-2 aired)
 Pretty Little Liars (seasons 1-5 aired)
 Rizzoli & Isles (season 1-5 aired)
 Scorpion (seasons 1-2 aired)
 The Last Ship (season 1 aired)
 Shameless (seasons 1-3 aired)
 The Vampire Diaries (seasons 1-4 aired)
 Unforgettable (seasons 1-3 aired)

Ended
 24
 30 Rock
 666 Park Avenue
 Almost Human
 Amiche mie
 Annem
 Asi
 Aşk-ı Memnu
 Aşk ve Ceza
 Better with You
 Bolji život
 Breaking Bad
 Breaking In
 Castle
 Caterina e le sue figlie
 Cimmer fraj
 Chase
 Christopher Columbus
 CSI: Cyber
 Crusoe
 Cult
 Dallas
 Dawson's Creek
 Drop Dead Diva
 Eastwick
 Elveda Derken
 Fatmagül'ün Suçu Ne?
 Flash Gordon
 Forever
 Franklin & Bash
 Friends
 Full House
 Gilmore Girls
 Glory Daze
 Golden Boy
 Ground Floor
 Gümüş
 Hank
 Hanımın Çiftliği
 Hawthorne
 Hellcats
 Hispania, la leyenda
 Hitna 94
 Hostages
 Human Target
 I Hate My Teenage Daughter
 Inspector Rex
 Jamie at Home
 Jamie's Ministry of Food
 Jamie's 30 Minutes Meals
 Kaybolan Yillar
 Krypto the Superdog
 La Femme Nikita
 Lie to Me
 The Looney Tunes Show
 Mad Love
 Made in Jersey
 Mr. Bean
 Mr. Sunshine
 Menekşe ile Halil
 Miami Medical
 The Mysteries of Laura
 Mystery Woman
 Naša mala klinika
 Nati ieri
 Nikita
 North and South
 Numb3rs
 Partners
 Past Life
 Perception
 Person of Interest
 Plain Jane
 Political Animals
 Psych
 Ravenswood
 Revolution
 Ricomincio da me
 Scooby-Doo! Mystery Incorporated
 Sasuke
 Save Me
 Seinfeld
 Sex and the City
 Sıla
 Sonbahar	
 Sheena
 Suburgatory
 Stalker
 Sullivan & Son
 Super Fun Night
 The Big C
 The Carrie Diaries
 The Client List
 The Forgotten
 The Fresh Prince of Bel-Air
 The Glades
 The Harveytoons Show
 The Lottery
 The Mentalist
 The Mists of Avalon
 The Mob Doctor
 The Nanny
 The Secret Circle
 The Thorn Birds
 The Thorn Birds: The Missing Years
 The Tudors
 Undercovers
 V
 Vruć vetar
 Walker, Texas Ranger
 XIII: The Series

TV & reality series/shows

Airing currently
 American Restoration (season 2 airing)
 Extreme Makeover (rerun of all seasons)

Ended
 Doma IN *
 Dr. 90210
 Extreme Makeover
 Fantasy Homes Down Under
 Grill Boss *
 Koktel *
 Mamin svijet *
 Masters of Illusion
 Slatki Božić *
 So You Think You Can Dance (seasons 5 & 6 aired)
 Super homes
 The Nate Berkus Show
 Zadovoljna *
 ZelenJava *

* Croatian TV shows

References

External links

Official Site 

Central European Media Enterprises
Television channels in Croatia
Television channels and stations established in 2011
2011 establishments in Croatia
Croatian-language television stations